Stacey Knecht (born 1957 in Brooklyn, NY) is an American translator. She primarily translates literary works from the Czech and Dutch (and Flemish) languages into English.

She won the James S. Holmes Translation Award (1993) for her translation of Back to the Congo by Lieve Joris, and the inaugural Vondel Prize (1996) for her translation of The Great Longing by Marcel Möring. She was also a runner-up for the 2015 Best Translated Book Award for her translation of Harlequin’s Millions by Bohumil Hrabal.

In addition to her translation work, Stacey is founder and director of the Books Away From Home Foundation and an avid teacher of Dutch as a second language. She lives in The Hague, in the Netherlands.

The Books Away From Home Foundation provides refugee children with books in their native language, to help ease their transition to an unfamiliar place.

References

1957 births
Dutch translators
Living people